Palca District is one of nine districts of the province Tarma in Peru.

References

Populated places established in 1857
1857 establishments in Peru